Valentin Herr (born 1 July 1957) is a German former football manager and player who played as a goalkeeper.

References

1957 births
Living people
German footballers
Bayer 04 Leverkusen II players
Bayer 04 Leverkusen players
Kickers Offenbach players
Alemannia Aachen players
Viktoria Aschaffenburg players
SV Waldhof Mannheim players
Association football goalkeepers
Bundesliga players
2. Bundesliga players
German football managers
SV Waldhof Mannheim managers
Kickers Offenbach managers
SV Eintracht Trier 05 managers
Borussia Neunkirchen managers